Events in the year 1965 in Spain.

Incumbents
Caudillo: Francisco Franco

Births
March 12 - Javier Moreno.
October 6 - Jordi Aviles.
October 21 - Rosa Estaràs.
Full date unknown:
 Carmen Pagés-Serra (born 1965), research economist and writer

Deaths

See also
 List of Spanish films of 1965

References

 
Years of the 20th century in Spain
1960s in Spain
Spain
Spain